The 2019 Townsville 400 (formally known as 2019 Watpac Townsville 400) was a motor racing event for the Supercars Championship, held on the weekend of 5-7 July 2019. The event was held at Townsville Street Circuit near Townsville, Queensland and consisted of two races, both 200 kilometres in length. It was the eighth event of fifteen in the 2019 Supercars Championship and hosted Races 17 and 18 of the season.

Race 17 was won by Scott McLaughlin, while Shane van Gisbergen won Race 18. David Reynolds and Cameron Waters claimed pole positions at the event.

Report

Background

Entry alterations
Michael Caruso returned to Garry Rogers Motorsport to replace the injured Richie Stanaway, following Chris Pither's entries at the Winton SuperSprint and Darwin Triple Crown. The event marked Caruso's first event in the category since the 2018 Newcastle 500.

References

Townsville 400
Townsville 400